Eldritch, an English word used to describe something otherworldly or uncanny, may refer to:

 Eldritch (band), an Italian heavy metal band
 Eldritch (video game), a 2013 first-person shooter based on the works of H. P. Lovecraft
 Andrew Eldritch (born 1959), English singer, songwriter, and musician

See also
 Lovecraftian horror
 
 
 Eldridge (disambiguation)